Rosy Simas is Haudenosaunee. She is an enrolled member of the Seneca Nation of Indians. Simas is a dance and transdisciplinary artist and the Founder and Artistic Director of Rosy Simas Danse.

Choreography 
Rosy Simas creates work for stage and installation that unifies movement, time-based media, sound, and sculpture. Since 2012 she has collaborated with French composer François Richomme. Their collaborative works include: We Wait In The Darkness (2014); Skin(s) (2016); Weave  (2019); Threshold, a film with photographer Douglas Beasley (2013); and WEave:HERE with Heid E. Erdrich (2019).

Exhibitions

Solo 
 We Wait In The Darkness, All My Relations Art, Minneapolis, MN. (2014)
 All My Relations: A Seneca History, Mitchell Museum of the American Indian (2015)
 Blood Lines: Images of Attachments, Seneca Iroquois National Museum, Salamanca, NY. (2020)
 she who lives on the road to war, Weisman Art Museum, Minneapolis, MN. (2020)

Group 
 SKEW LINES: a residency and installations, Heid E. Erdrich and Rosy Simas. SOO Visual Arts Center, Minneapolis, MN. (2019)
 Waasamoo-Beshizi (Power-Lines), Plains Art Museum, Fargo, ND. (2019)
 Identity/Identify, Iroquois Indian Museum, Howes Cave, NY. (2020-2021)

Honors and awards 
 Native Arts and Cultures Foundation Artist Fellowship (2013)
 Twin Cities City Pages Artist of the Year (2014)
 Sage Award for Film and Set Design (2014)
 Guggenheim Creative Arts Fellowship for Choreography (2015)
 McKnight Fellowship for Choreography (2016)
 First People's Fund Artists in Business Leadership Fellow (2016)
 Joyce Award from the Joyce Foundation with the Ordway Center of the Performing Arts (2018)
 Dance/USA Artist Fellowships (2019)
 Twin Cities City Pages Best Choreographer (2020)
 McKnight Fellowship for Choreography (2022)
 United States Artists Artist Fellowship (2022)

Publications 
 Simas, Rosy (2016) My Making of We Wait in the Darkness. Dance Research Journal, vol. 48 no. 1.
 Simas, Rosy and Bodhrán, Ahimsa Timoteo (2019) Sovereign Movements Building and Sustaining Native Dance And Performance Communities A Dialogue, Movement Research Performance Journal, Sovereign Movements: Native Dance and Performance, Issue 52/53, Fall 2019.
 Simas, Rosy and Morgan, Christopher K. (2019) Longer Scores: Native Choreographic Turns, Curatorial Visions, and Community Engagement
 Simas, Rosy and Mitchell, Sam (2019)  Playing Indian, between Idealization and Vilification: Seems You have to Play Indian to be Indian. American Indian Culture and Research Journal, vol. 43 no.4.
 Simas, Rosy (2022) The body is an archive: Collective memory; ancestral knowledge, culture and history. Music, Dance and the Archive. Edited by Amanda Harris, Linda Barwick and Jakelin Troy

References

External links

1967 births
Living people
Native American dancers
Modern dancers
20th-century American women artists
21st-century American women artists
Native American women artists
Native American performance artists
Native American artists
People from Jacksonville, Florida
American choreographers
Seneca people
Dancers from Minnesota